Machnatka  is a village in the administrative district of Gmina Błędów, within Grójec County, Masovian Voivodeship, in east-central Poland.

The village has a population of 140.

References

Machnatka